Wilhelm "Willy" Dörr (7 August 1881 – 4 April 1955) was a German track and field athlete and tug of war competitor who competed in the 1906 Intercalated Games. He was born and died in Frankfurt am Main. In 1906, he was part of the German team which won the gold medal in the tug of war competition. In the ancient pentathlon contest he finished 16th and he also participated in the discus throw event but his result is unknown.

References 
 

1881 births
1955 deaths
Sportspeople from Frankfurt
German male discus throwers
Olympic athletes of Germany
Olympic tug of war competitors of Germany
Athletes (track and field) at the 1906 Intercalated Games
Tug of war competitors at the 1906 Intercalated Games
Olympic gold medalists for Germany
World record setters in athletics (track and field)
Medalists at the 1906 Intercalated Games